The Tesseract is a novel by Alex Garland. It was initially published by Viking Press in 1998.

Overview
The story intertwines the lives of Manila gangsters, mothers and street children. The novel chronicles numerous characters in non-linear storylines and explores themes of love, fate, violence, power, and choices. It is Garland's second novel.

The term 'tesseract' is used for the three-dimensional net of the four-dimensional hypercube rather than the hypercube itself. It is a metaphor for the characters' inability to understand the causes behind the events which shape their lives: they can only visualize the superficial world they inhabit.

Adaptation
The book was adapted into a film, The Tesseract, which changed the setting to Bangkok. It was directed by Oxide Pang and starred Jonathan Rhys Meyers and Saskia Reeves.

References

1998 British novels
English novels
British novels adapted into films
Novels by Alex Garland
Novels set in Manila
Viking Press books
Nonlinear narrative novels